The Thackray Museum of Medicine in Leeds, West Yorkshire, England, is a museum of the history of medicine adjacent to St James's University Hospital. It opened in March 1997 as the Thackray Medical Museum. In 1998 it won "Museum of the Year" and has other awards including in 2004 both the "Excellence in England Small Tourist Attraction of the Year" and "Sandford Award for Heritage Education".

As of 17 May 2021, the museum reopened its doors. The museum closed temporarily in 2019 for a £4 million refurbishment, while the museum conference centre and car park remained open, and remained closed because of the COVID-19 pandemic. In October 2020 it was announced that the museum was to receive £370,000 from the Culture Recovery Fund to help it to re-open safely. In December 2020 the museum's conference centre was used as a COVID-19 vaccination hub. The redeveloped museum has since been shortlisted for Art Fund's Museum of the Year award 2021.

History
The building is a Grade II listed building, the former Leeds Union Workhouse, which opened in 1861 (foundation stone laid 1858) to accommodate 784 paupers. By the end of the 19th century, the buildings had become largely used for medical care of the poor, rather than workhouse and training.  During the First World War it was called the East Leeds War Hospital, caring for armed services personnel. The building was later known as the Ashley Wing, which was part of the hospital until the 1990s when the old Leeds Union Workhouse building was considered unfit for modern medicine. As a listed building, it could not be demolished and Parliament gave permission for it to house the Thackray Medical Museum, which opened in 1997.

The museum's origins can be traced to Great George Street, Leeds, where Charles Thackray opened a small family-run chemist shop in 1902.  In less than a century the corner shop grew into one of Britain's principal medical companies, Chas F Thackray Limited, manufacturing drugs and medical instruments and pioneering the hip replacement operation alongside Sir John Charnley. In the 1980s Charles Thackray's grandson Paul Thackray established a small collection as an archive of the Leeds-based medical supplies company.  In 1990 a charitable trust was established to develop the collection.

Museum displays
Before the 2021 redevelopment, highlights included Leeds 1842: Life in Victorian Leeds: visitors walked through a reproduction of slum streets complete with authentic sights, sounds and smells and were invited to follow the lives, ailments and treatments of eight Victorian characters, making the choices that determine their survival amongst the rats, fleas and bedbugs.  Pain, Pus and Blood described surgery before anaesthesia, and how pain relief progressed and Having a Baby focused on developments in safety for childbirth.  Hannah Dyson's Ordeal was a video reconstruction of 1842 surgery, before anaesthetics were in use: visitors watched as a surgeon, his assistant and a group of trainee doctors prepared for Hannah Dyson's operation - the amputation of her leg after it was crushed in a mill accident. (The actual operation was not seen in the reconstruction.)  The LifeZone! was an interactive children's gallery, looking at how the human body works, with a smaller room for the under-fives. The 'Recovery?' Gallery explored treatment of veterans of warfare, looking at the First World War and modern conflict medicine. There was a temporary exhibition gallery which changed annually.

Collection
The Thackray Medical Museum houses a collection of over 47,000 objects from medical history which date from Roman times to the present day, along with 15,000 trade catalogues and 9,000 books on medicine and healthcare. Highlights include Prince Albert's personal medicine chest and Hitler's blood transfusion kit. The strengths of the collection include European surgical instruments from the 1600s to today;  a "nationally significant collection" of hearing aids including the British Society of Audiology collection; the J F Wilkinson Pharmaceutical Ceramics Collection; patent medicines, and domestic first aid kits.

The Thackray Medical Museum featured in Most Haunted on 1 November 2015 on Really (TV channel).

Temporary exhibitions
In 2016 the Thackray Medical Museum was one of fifteen venues across the UK, Europe and Africa to have been selected by the Wellcome Trust to, simultaneously, exhibit the winning collection from the Wellcome Image Awards. The awards celebrate scientists, clinicians, photographers and artists of images that best communicate significant aspects of biomedical science. A temporary exhibition of twenty images was displayed at the Thackray Medical Museum. The display included inside the human eye, a 3D image produced using optical coherence tomography. The image depicts blood vessels as tunnel like structures. Other images focused on bone development, the Ebola virus and engineering human liver tissue.

Temporary exhibitions planned for 2021 include Mothers in Lockdown and Stitch Your Story.

Medicine and history lecture series
The museum offers a medicine and history public lecture series on Saturday mornings which runs from October to March each year.  Lectures focus on the changing nature of health and medicine.

Education and learning
Visited by 20,000 school students each year the museum delivers a series of in-classroom work and education resources, loans boxes and teacher events. The museum has been awarded the Sandford Award for Heritage Education.

See also
Listed buildings in Leeds (Gipton and Harehills Ward)

References

External links

 
 Yorkshire Medical and Dental History Society
 Wellcome Image Awards 2016
 
 

Museums in Leeds
Grade II listed buildings in Leeds
Medical museums in England
History museums in West Yorkshire